Tremezzina is a comune in the province of Como, in Lombardy, that formed on 25 May 2014 from a merger of the comunes of Lenno, Mezzegra, Ossuccio and Tremezzo.

A referendum to create this comune was held on 1 December 2013. The referendum was passed with 63% yes and 37% no votes.

The comune of Tremezzina was previously created in 1928 over Lenno, Mezzegra and Tremezzo, and divided into the separate comunes in 1947.

References

States and territories established in 2014